Pakir Shahsavar (also Romanized as Pakīr Shahsavār; also known as Peykeh-ye Shahsavār) is a village in Dust Mohammad Rural District, in the Central District of Hirmand County, Sistan and Baluchestan Province, Iran. At the 2006 census, its population was 262, in 45 families.

References 

Populated places in Hirmand County